The Test de connaissance du français (TCF) is a language placement test for non-native speakers of French. It is administered by the Centre international d'études pédagogiques (CIEP) for the French Ministry of Education. It fulfils French language entry requirements, can be used to demonstrate language ability for job applications or for personal use, and is used by Canada or Québec for immigration procedures.

The TCF  follows the European standards for language tests as set forward in the Common European Framework of Reference for Languages and is equal to DALF, also offered by the CIEP.

Lowest level is A1 indicating beginner, top fluency levels are C1 and C2.

Level C1 and C2 indicate advanced mastery of French. French university Sciences-Po uses TCF level C1 as the primary language prerequisite for evaluating the abilities of non-native speakers to follow academic discussions and carry out academic research in the French language. 
 
The test is made up of compulsory and optional sections. The reading, listening and language structures sections are mandatory while the writing and speaking sections are optional.

The compulsory examinations
These examinations consist of 80 multiple-choice questions in total, with progressive difficulty starting from level A1 to level C2 of the Common European Framework of Reference for Languages.

Listening comprehension
This part consists of 30 questions and lasts for 25 minutes, with recordings from spoken text heard in France or French-speaking countries. Candidates are expected to:
identify and understand the main information communicated in everyday conversations (dialogues, interviews, discussions, telephone conversations, etc.);
identify the topic of a conversation;
understand the main points of a spoken text on familiar topics encountered in a personal or professional environment.
understand the main ideas in complex spoken texts on a concrete or abstract topic, familiar or unfamiliar;
recognise a wide range of idiomatic expressions;
understand any type of spoken language delivered at fast speed.

Use of language structures: grammar and vocabulary
This part consists of 20 questions and takes 20 minutes to complete. These questions test the ability of candidates to master the structure of the language, from basic to more complex communicative situations, by:
identifying lexical or language register errors;
choosing the equivalent of an expression or a grammatical term;
selecting the correct formulations in accordance with a communicative situation.

Reading comprehension
There are 30 questions in the part, and 45 minutes to complete. The questions test the candidates' ability to understand:
familiar names, words and very simple sentences used in communication situations (or administrative messages and informal letters);
the information in everyday materials (advertisements, prospectuses, menus and timetables, etc.);
information about people, facts or events (personal letters);
texts written in everyday language related to everyday life or work;
articles and reports in which the authors take a stand on concrete and abstract topics;
factual and literary texts, long and complex, specialized items;
abstract or complex texts taken from books, scholarly articles, literary works.

The optional examinations

Spoken expression
The spoken expression examination takes the form of a one-to-one interview with an examiner, which lasts for 15 minutes maximum. Preparation is not required for this examination. The questions are divided into six levels, from level A1 to level C2 of the Common European Framework of Reference for Languages. The interview is recorded and sent to the CIEP for centralized assessment after the examination.   

The candidate is assessed on their ability to communicate and react to the cues given by the examiner. Candidates are asked to:
describe places (home, work, etc.) and people;
talk about their living conditions, and current, recent or future work or studies;
describe experiences, events and plans;
explain a plan or an idea, the plot of a book or film and express their reactions;
explain the advantages and disadvantages of a plan, give their opinion, express their agreement and disagreement;
present a clear and structured argument in a style appropriate to the context;
present detailed and structured descriptions of complex topics, developing particular points and rounding off with a conclusion.

Written expression
This examination includes six exercises that get progressively more difficult, each of which corresponds to one of the six levels of the Common European Framework of Reference for Languages (level A1 to level C2). Candidates have 1 hour 45 minutes to complete this examination.

Description of the exercises:
writing a simple message (approx. 40 words);
writing a personal letter about everyday situations, using an everyday register (approx. 60 words);
writing a report of experiences, a story, an account of an opinion (approx. 80 words); 
writing an explanatory text, which develops points of view and a line of argument (approx. 100 words);
comparing two opinions and taking a stand on a general topic (100 to 125 words); 
rewording the main ideas in a document, account of a point of view with justifications (approx. 100 words).

Candidates are assessed on their ability to:      
follow the instructions given;
communicate a message clearly;
link ideas and show consistency in their views;
express their opinion and provide justifications;
use a range of vocabulary related to the task they have been requested to perform;
show that they can use complex structures proficiently;
show that they have the ability to synthesise;
reword in their own words.

Test scores
TCF scores are ranked on 6 levels, ranging from A1 to C2 of the Common European Framework of Reference for Languages.

External links
France Education International's TCF page

French language tests
Immigration to Quebec